Warczewiczella marginata is a species of orchid native to Colombia, Venezuela, and Panama.

References

External links 

marginata
Epiphytic orchids
Orchids of South America
Orchids of Central America